WCSE-LP (100.1 FM) was a radio station licensed to serve Ledyard, Connecticut. The station was last owned by Calvary Chapel of Southeastern Connecticut. It aired a Christian radio format. It served southeastern Connecticut, Rhode Island, and eastern Long Island.

The station was assigned the WCSE-LP call letters by the Federal Communications Commission on November 21, 2002.

Its license was cancelled on April 4, 2022 for failing to file a renewal application.

References

External links
WCSE-LP official website
 

CSE-LP
CSE-LP
Ledyard, Connecticut
Radio stations established in 2002
Radio stations disestablished in 2022
2002 establishments in Connecticut
2022 disestablishments in Connecticut
Defunct radio stations in the United States
Defunct religious radio stations in the United States
CSE-LP